Rosenfeld is an unincorporated community in west central Brewster County, Texas, United States. It is 73 miles east of Alpine, Texas and 25 miles west of Sanderson, Texas. Not much is known about Rosenfeld except that it is on a connecting road to U.S. Highway 90 and is on the Pacific Railroad which could mean that it used to be a railway stop.

References

Unincorporated communities in Texas
Unincorporated communities in Brewster County, Texas